Justice Cunningham (born 1991), is an American football tight end. Justice Cunningham may also refer to:

Bill Cunningham (judge) (born 1944), associate justice of the Kentucky Supreme Court
Donald L. Cunningham (1866–1947), associate justice of the Arizona Supreme Court
Edwin Wilber Cunningham (1842–1905), associate justice of the Kansas Supreme Court
Joseph F. Cunningham (1924–2008), associate justice of the Supreme Court of Illinois